Lion-baiting is a blood sport involving the baiting of lions against dogs.

Antiquity

Antiquity has examples where groups of dogs defeat the 'king of beasts', the lion. Greek legend reflects Achilles' shield with the depiction of a fight of his dog against two lions. A second is a report that Cambyses II of the Achaemenid Empire possessed a dog that started a fight with two full-grown lions. A third, is reported by a Roman historian, Claudius Aelianus, in which he states Indians showed Alexander the Great powerful dogs bred for lion-baiting. Certainly, ancient historians would embellish and exaggerate their stories, but they do capture the spirit of dog versus lion.

Europe

17th century
In 1610, during the reign of James I of England the practice of lion-baiting was first recorded. The spectacle was staged for the amusement of the court. The King requested Edward Alleyn, Master of the Beargarden, to acquire the three largest and most courageous dogs. The event was as follows:

"One of the dogs, which was the first to be sent in the cage, was soon put out of action by the lion, which seized it by the head and neck and dragged it through the cage. A second dog was sent in and met with the same fate. The third, however, which came to its aid, immediately seized the lion by the lower jaw and gripped it securely for a considerable time until, severely injured by the lion's claws, it was forced to loosen its grip. The lion itself was injured in the fight and did not wish to continue fighting. With a sudden mighty leap over the dogs, it fled inside its den. Two of the dogs died shortly after the fight from the injuries they had suffered. The last, however, survived this splendid fight and was nursed back to health with great care by the King's son, Henry Frederick, Prince of Wales. Prince Henry declared: 'He had fought the king of the wild animals and should never again have to fight baser creatures!' In this way, the dog had gained for itself a safe life at the English Royal court."

18th century

In 1790, The Times reported a lion-baiting in Vienna as follows:

"There was a lion fight at the amphitheatre of Vienna, in the summer of 1790, which was almost the last permitted in that capital. The amphitheatre at Vienna embraced an area of from eighty to a hundred feet in diameter. The lower part of the structure comprised the dens of the different animals. Above those dens, and about ten feet from the ground, were the first and principal seats, over which were galleries. In the course of the entertainment, a den was opened, out of which stalked, in free and ample range, a most majestic lion; and, soon after, a fallow deer was let into the circus from another den. The deer instantly fled, and bounded round the circular space, pursued by the lion; but the quick and sudden turnings of the former continually baulked the effort of its pursuer. After this ineffectual chase had continued for several minutes, a door was opened, through which the deer escaped; and presently five or six of the large and fierce Hungarian Mastiffs were sent in. The lion, at the moment of their entrance, was leisurely returning to his den, the door of which stood open. The dogs, which entered behind him, flew towards him in a body, with the utmost fury, making the amphitheatre ring with their barking. When they reached the lion, the noble animal stopped, and deliberately turned towards them. The dogs instantly retreated a few steps, increasing their vociferations, and the lion slowly resumed his progress towards his den. The dogs again approached; the lion turned his head; his adversaries halted; and this continued until, on his nearing his den, the dogs separated, and approached him on different sides. The lion then turned quickly round, like one whose dignified patience could brook the harassment of insolence no longer. The dogs fled far, as if instinctively sensible of the power of wrath they had at length provoked. One unfortunate dog, however, which had approached too near to effect his escape, was suddenly seized by the paw of the lion; and the piercing yells which he sent forth quickly caused his comrades to recede to the door of entrance at the opposite site of the area, where they stood in a row, barking and yelling in concert with their miserable associate. After arresting the struggling and yelling prisoner for a short time, the lion couched upon him with his forepaws and mouth. The struggles of the sufferer grew feebler and feebler, until at length he became perfectly motionless. We all concluded him to be dead. In this composed posture of executive justice, the lion remained for at least ten minutes, when he majestically rose, and with a slow step entered his den, and disappeared. The apparent corpse continued to lie motionless for a few minutes; presently the dog, to his amazement, and that of the whole amphitheatre, found himself alive, and rose with his nose pointed to the ground, his tail between his hind legs pressing his belly, and, as soon as he was certified of his existence, he made off for the door in a long trot, through which he escaped with his more fortunate companions."

J. March's, Zoological Anecdotes, circa 1845, has the story of a second lion-bait, which occurred in Vienna in the year 1791 as follows:

"Of late years the truth of the accounts which have been so long current, respecting the generous disposition of the lion, have been called in question. Several travellers, in their accounts of Asia and Africa, describe him as of a more rapacious and sanguinary disposition than had formerly been supposed, although few of them have had the opportunity to make him a particular object of their attention. A circumstance that occurred not long since in Vienna seems, however, to confirm the more ancient accounts. In the year 1791, at which period the custom of baiting wild beasts still existed in that city, a combat was to be exhibited between a lion and a number of large dogs. As soon as the noble animal made his appearance, four large bull-dogs were turned loose upon him, three of which, however, as soon as they came near him, took fright, and ran away. One only had courage to remain, and make the attack. The lion, however, without rising from the ground upon which he was lying, showed him, by a single stroke with his paw, how greatly his superior he was in strength; for the dog was instantly stretched motionless on the ground. The lion drew him towards him, and laid his fore-paws upon him in such a manner that only a small part of his body could be seen. Every one imagined that the dog was dead, and that the lion would soon rise and devour him. But they were mistaken. The dog began to move, and struggled to get loose, which the lion permitted him to do. He seemed merely to have warned him not to meddle with him any more; but when the dog attempted to run away, and had already got half over the enclosure, the lion's indignation seemed to be excited. He sprang from the ground, and in two leaps reached the fugitive, who had just got as far as the paling, and was whining to have it opened for him to escape. The flying animal had called the instinctive propensity of the monarch of the forest into action: the defenceless enemy now excited his pity; for the generous lion stepped a few paces backward, and looked quietly on, while a small door was opened to let the dog out of the enclosure. This unequivocal trait of generosity moved every spectator. A shout of applause resounded throughout the assembly, who had enjoyed a satisfaction of a description far superior to what they had expected. It is possible that the African lion, when, under the impulse of hunger, he goes out to seek his prey, may not so often exhibit this magnanimous disposition; for in that case he is compelled by imperious necessity to satisfy the cravings of nature; but when his appetite is satiated, he never seeks for prey, nor does he ever destroy to gratify a blood-thirsty disposition."

19th century

In 1825, two more lion fights took place, staged by a promoter named George Wombwell, who travelled around England with his collection of caged wild animals. The fights were arranged in collaboration with dog dealers Ben White and Bill George. The cage measured fifteen feet square, ten feet high, with an elevated floor six feet from the ground. The old iron bars were wide enough apart for a dog to enter or escape. The first bait involved the lion named "Nero" and the second bait a lion named "Wallace".

The Morning Herald of 26 July 1825, provided the following account:

Wallace

Wombwell, in the same week, submitted another of his lions to be baited and this match proved to be a very different proposition for the dogs. The Times gave an account of the contest as follows:

Wallace was the first African lion to be bred in the UK, having been born in Edinburgh in 1812. He was probably named after Scottish fighter William Wallace. He died in 1838, and his stuffed body placed in the museum in Saffron Walden, Essex. When in 1930, Marriott Edgar wrote his humorous monologue The Lion and Albert, he called the lion "Wallace".

Outrage
The public were outraged at the promotion of such baiting spectacles and the matter was raised in the Parliament of the United Kingdom. Wombwell's lion baits were the last to be staged in the United Kingdom.

See also

 History of lions in Europe

References

Further reading

Baiting (blood sport)
Lions in popular culture
Cambyses II